"Rock and Roll All Nite" is a song by American rock band Kiss, originally released on their 1975 album Dressed to Kill. It was released as the A-side of their fifth single, with the album track "Getaway". The studio version of the song peaked at No. 69 on the Billboard singles chart, besting the band's previous charting single, "Kissin' Time" (#89). A subsequent live version, released as a single in October 1975, eventually reached No. 12 in early 1976, the first of six Top 20 songs for Kiss in the 1970s. "Rock and Roll All Nite" became Kiss's signature song and has served as the group's closing concert number in almost every concert since 1976.   In 2008, it was named the 16th greatest hard rock song of all time by VH1.

Recording
"Rock and Roll All Nite" was written by Paul Stanley and Gene Simmons while Kiss was still in Los Angeles, as part of their Hotter than Hell Tour. However, during the group's concert at Cobo Hall in Detroit on January 26, 1976, Stanley introduced it as a song that was written in and for Detroit. The tour ended early (February 1975), when Casablanca Records founder and president Neil Bogart ordered Kiss to return to the studio to record a follow up to Hotter Than Hell, which had stalled on the charts and failed to meet Casablanca's sales expectations. One of Bogart's instructions to the band was to compose an anthem, something he felt the band needed. The song itself was inspired by the Slade song "Mama Weer All Crazee Now".

They wrote the pre-chorus, Stanley wrote the chorus, and Simmons wrote the verses, borrowing parts of a song he had previously written, entitled "Drive Me Wild". The song was one of two the group recorded toward the end of the Hotter than Hell Tour prior to returning to Electric Lady Studios for the proper Dressed to Kill recording sessions. For the choruses, the band and Bogart brought in a large group of outside contributors to sing and clap, including members of the Kiss road crew, studio musicians, and Peter Criss's wife Lydia. Some of the road crew used their jacket zippers to create sound.

Reception
Cash Box said that "the undulating beat and anthem-like quality of the chorus add up to a satanic hit" and that it opens with "pounding drums and a ferocious guitar roar."  Record World said that the "group allows their drummer and vocals to take control of the moment as they get down to r&r basics with the best of 'em."

KISS' version appears in a 2022 TV commercial for Applebee's. In 2021, it was listed at No. 404 on Rolling Stone's "Top 500 Best Songs of All Time".

Live performances
While "Rock and Roll All Nite" would eventually become a fixture in Kiss's live performances, it was not inserted into the band's setlist immediately. Nor did it immediately replace "Let Me Go, Rock 'n' Roll" as the closing number. The ending of the live version of "Rock and Roll All Nite" is taken from "Getaway" (which, as indicated above, was released as the single's B-side). Kiss performed the song during the closing ceremonies for the 2002 Winter Olympics in Salt Lake City which proved to be Ace Frehley's final performance with Kiss to date. They also performed the song live with Adam Lambert during the season 8 finale of American Idol, on May 20, 2009, at the Nokia Theater in Los Angeles.

On , this song was performed on The 70th NHK Red & White Year-End Song Festival featuring X Japan's drummer/pianist Yoshiki Hayashi.

Other versions
The original version of the song, as it appears on Dressed To Kill, does not have a guitar solo, while many later versions do have one. The Kiss Unplugged version features Ace Frehley and Bruce Kulick sharing the solo. The Unplugged version was released as a single and reached number 13 on Billboard's Mainstream Rock Tracks.  The original version also ends while fading away; all live versions end with the last notes of another Dressed to Kill song, "Getaway" (which, as indicated above, was released as the studio-version single's B-side). The chorus of Alive!s version of the song is played at the beginning of "Detroit Rock City", from 1976's Destroyer.

Kiss collaborated with Japanese girl group Momoiro Clover Z on the single "Yume no Ukiyo ni Saite Mi na", consisting of the title track and a version of "Rock and Roll All Nite".

Appearances
"Rock and Roll All Nite" has appeared on the following Kiss albums:
Dressed to Kill (1975) – Original studio version
Alive! (1975) – Live version
The Originals (1976) - Studio version
Double Platinum (1978) – Studio version
Killers (1982) – Live version
Smashes, Thrashes & Hits (1988) – Remixed studio version
Chikara (1988)
Alive III (1993) – Live version
Kiss Unplugged (1996) – Acoustic live version
You Wanted the Best, You Got the Best!! (1996) – Live version from Alive!
Greatest Kiss (1997) – Studio version
The Box Set (2001) – Studio version and Live version
The Very Best of Kiss (2002) – Live version from Alive!
Kiss Symphony: Alive IV (2003) – Live version with the Melbourne Symphony Orchestra
The Best of Kiss: The Millennium Collection (2003) – Live version from Alive! (album re-released in 2010 as ICON)
Gold (2005) – Live version from Alive!
Kiss Chronicles: 3 Classic Albums (2006) - Studio version
Kiss Alive! 1975–2000 (2006) – Live version from The Box Set
Kiss Chronicles – Original studio version (as part of repackaging of Dressed To Kill)
Alive IIm³ - release of Alive!, Alive II, Alive III, plus Alive! The Millennium Concert – Single Edit Version
Kiss Klassics (2008) – re-recorded version included on a bonus CD with Sonic Boom
 Ikons (2008) - Studio version
 Kiss Alive 35 (2009) – Live album produced at each of the venues
 Kiss Sonic Boom Over Europe (2010) - Live versions
 Kiss 40 (2014) – Live version from Alive!

Personnel
Gene Simmons – lead vocals, bass
Paul Stanley – rhythm guitar, backing vocals
Ace Frehley – lead guitar, backing vocals
Peter Criss – drums, backing vocals

Charts
Weekly chartsStudio versionLive version'''

Year-end charts

Certifications

Poison version

American rock band Poison covered and released "Rock and Roll All Nite" as a single from the soundtrack to the film Less than Zero in 1987. It was released on a Poison album The Best of Poison: 20 Years of Rock in 2006 and again on the cover album Poison'd in 2007.

At the start of "Nothin' But a Good Time" music video, Poison's rendition of "Rock and Roll All Nite" is heard on the radio.

Personnel
 Bret Michaels – vocals, rhythm guitar
 Bobby Dall – bass
 Rikki Rockett – drums
 C.C. DeVille – lead guitar

References

External links
 "Rock and Roll All Nite", version from Exposed''

Kiss (band) songs
1975 singles
1996 singles
1987 singles
Poison (American band) songs
Songs about rock music
Songs written by Paul Stanley
Songs written by Gene Simmons
Capitol Records singles
Casablanca Records singles
Live singles
Enigma Records singles
1975 songs
Songs about nights